Jason Christopher Watson (born June 22, 1981), who goes by the stage name Json, is an American Christian hip hop musician. He was a member of Christian hip hop collective, 116 Clique.

Early life
Json was born Jason Christopher Watson, in St. Louis, Missouri on June 22, 1981. When he was three years old his father died. His mother Barbara moved the family to Los Angeles, California, where she became a crack-cocaine addict and was arrested, separating herself from her son because she was forced to move back to St. Louis. Json would soon follow her back to the Midwest city, became a drug abuser, and was incarcerated.

Personal life
Json married his longtime girlfriend Lawanda Nicole "Nikki" Watson (née, Childress), after they both stopped abusing drugs, and converted to Christianity. They reside with their children in Iowa City, Iowa. They are the co-directors of The Spot Outreach Ministry of Parkview Church.

Music career
Json was a member in the Christian hip hop collective 116 Clique. He released The Seasoning in 2005, Life on Life in 2008, City Lights in 2010, Growing Pains in 2012, and Braille in 2013. The last three of those albums charted on various Billboard charts. The rapper planned to release his sixth studio album, No Filter, on March 10, 2015 through Lamp Mode Recordings.

Discography

Studio albums

References

1981 births
Living people
African-American rappers
African-American Christians
Midwest hip hop musicians
Performers of Christian hip hop music
Rappers from Iowa
Rappers from St. Louis
21st-century American rappers
21st-century African-American musicians
20th-century African-American people